Lančiūnava (formerly) is a village in Kėdainiai district municipality, in Kaunas County, in central Lithuania. According to the 2011 census, the village had a population of 503 people. There is a school, a vocational school, a kinder garden, a library, a forestry, a former manor palace with a park, a Catholic church of St. Casimir (built in 1880).

History
The Lančiūnava manor and village has been known since 1587. The manor was a property of the Kognowicki family of Italian descent. At the beginning of the 20th a nobleman Stanisław Kognowicki rebuilt the palace. The Kognowickis were known for cruel oppression of serfs.

During the Soviet era Lančiūnava developed as a sovkhoz with an agriculture and technology school (opened in 1940).

Demography

Images

References

Villages in Kaunas County
Kėdainiai District Municipality